V-drive is a propulsion system for boats that consists of two drive shafts, a gearbox, and a propeller. In a "V-drive" boat, the engine is mounted in the rear of the boat and the front of the engine faces aft. Connected to the rear of the engine is the transmission. The first drive shaft connects the rear of the transmission to a gearbox mounted in the center of the boat. The second drive shaft extends from the gearbox to the rear and out the bottom of the boat to where a propeller is mounted.

Fred Cooper's 1935 design for Malcolm Campbell's Blue Bird used a v-drive designed by Reid Railton for its 2,000 bhp engine.

References 

Marine propulsion